Goran Bezina (born  21 March 1980) is a Swiss former professional ice hockey defenseman who played most of his career with Genève-Servette HC of the National League (NL). He also played with the Arizona Coyotes in the National Hockey League (NHL), Medveščak Zagreb of the Kontinental Hockey League (KHL) HC Fribourg-Gottéron of the NL and HC Sierre of the Swiss League (SL).

Playing career
As a youth, Bezina played in the 1994 Quebec International Pee-Wee Hockey Tournament with a team from Switzerland.

A product of Monthey-Chablais HC, Bezina made his debut in the Swiss top-flight National League A (NLA) for HC Fribourg-Gottéron during the 1998-99 season and was drafted 234th overall by the Phoenix Coyotes in the 1999 NHL Entry Draft. From 2001 to 2004, he played within the Phoenix Coyotes organization with three NHL appearances for the Coyotes and 204 contests for their AHL affiliate, the Springfield Falcons.

Bezina spent most of his professional career with Genève-Servette HC of the National League A (NLA) and left the club after twelve years (ten of those as a captain) upon the conclusion of the 2015-16 season. In the course of his Genève-Servette stint, Bezina appeared in 639 NLA contests, scoring 384 points. In June 2016, he put pen to paper on a contract with Medvescak Zagreb of the Kontinental Hockey League (KHL), but returned to Genève-Servette on January 31, 2017. He eventually played 10 games with the team this year, tallying 3 assists. At the end of the season, Bezina was not offered a contract extension, making him a free agent.

On September 1, 2017, a few days before the start of the 2017–18 season, Bezina unexpectedly returned to Geneva on a 1-year deal worth CHF 750,000. He agreed to reduce his salary to play his 14th season with the Grenats. On April 17, 2018, Bezina agreed to a one-year contract extension with Geneva worth CHF 700,000.

On August 2, 2019, Bezina joined freshly promoted HC Sierre of the Swiss League (SL) on a one-year deal. On May 5, 2020, Bezina agreed to a one-year contract extension to remain with HC Sierre through the 2020/21 season. On June 22, 2021, Bezina signed a new one-year contract extension with Sierre for the 2021/22 season.

On August 17, 2022, Bezina officially retired from professional hockey.

International play 
Representing the Swiss national team, Bezina played at the 2006 Olympic Games and eleven World Championships.

Career statistics

Regular season and playoffs

International

References

External links
 

1980 births
Living people
Arizona Coyotes draft picks
Croatian emigrants to Switzerland
EC Red Bull Salzburg players
EHC Visp players
Genève-Servette HC players
HC Fribourg-Gottéron players
HC Villars players
Ice hockey players at the 2006 Winter Olympics
KHL Medveščak Zagreb players
Olympic ice hockey players of Switzerland
Phoenix Coyotes players
Sportspeople from Split, Croatia
Springfield Falcons players
Swiss ice hockey defencemen
Swiss expatriate sportspeople in the United States